A United States Marines Corps (USMC) Lockheed KC-130F Hercules, ferrying a group of US marines back to South Vietnam from rest-and-relaxation leave in then-British Hong Kong, crashed on take-off, causing a total of 59 deaths out of all 71 (both the flight-crew and the passengers) on board the aircraft on August 24, 1965.

The accident

Cause
The cause of the accident regarding the aircraft's crash was attributed to a partial failure of the No.1 engine during the plane's take-off from the runway.

References

Airliner accidents and incidents caused by engine failure
Accidents and incidents involving the Lockheed C-130 Hercules
Aviation accidents and incidents in 1965
1965 in Hong Kong
Accidents and incidents involving United States Navy and Marine Corps aircraft
Aviation accidents and incidents in Hong Kong